Paul Budnitz (born September 14, 1967) is an American entrepreneur. He is the founder of retailer Kidrobot, and the social network Ello. He also owns Budnitz Bicycles in Burlington, Vermont.

Biography

Early life and education
Paul Budnitz grew up in Berkeley, California in a Jewish family. His father was a nuclear physicist, and his mother was a social worker. He graduated from Berkeley High School and eventually transferred to Yale University in Connecticut.

Career
Budnitz is also a film director, and in 1996 he directed the film 93 Million Miles from the Sun. In 2001, he directed Ultraviolet, a 13-minute short film.

Budnitz is the founder of Kidrobot, Ello, Budnitz Bicycles, and Superplastic.

Personal life
Budnitz has lived in Boulder, Colorado; New York City; Montana; and Shelburne, Vermont. He is married to Sabine "Sa Budnitz" and the couple split their time between Vermont and New York City.

References

External links
PaulBudnitz.com

"Paul Budnitz from Kidrobot interviewed by Steven Heller", Core77, 27 August 2007.
Steven Heller, "Toy story" (review of I am Plastic), The New York Times, 28 January 2007.
"Paul Budnitz: Kidrobot", Nylon, 27 September 2007.

1967 births
Living people
American designers
Jewish American artists
Yale University alumni
Businesspeople from Boulder, Colorado
Businesspeople from Berkeley, California
People from Shelburne, Vermont
Businesspeople from Vermont
American toy industry businesspeople
21st-century American Jews